Capas, officially the Municipality of Capas (
), is a 1st class municipality in the province of Tarlac, Philippines, and one of the richest towns in the province. The town also consists of numerous subdivisions and exclusive villages.

Capas is being dubbed as the “Tourism Capital of Tarlac." Apart from being known as the final site of the infamous Bataan Death March, it is also known for Mount Pinatubo treks, where thousands of mountaineers and visitors go. The town has some industrial factories like the PilMiCo.

History

Originally a part of Zambales and Pampanga, its first settlers were the Kapampangan and the Aeta. It was founded in the year 1710 by the Augustinian Friars. During the American Colonial period, the Americans built the Camp O'Donell for military installation until when the Japanese used it as a concentration camp during the Bataan Death March as the last stop of the march.

Capas as all other towns in Tarlac province was a part of vast wilderness inhabited by the Abelling tribes known as Aetas. The history of Capas dates back in the late 16th century when immigrants from Pampanga, Zambales, Pangasinan and the Ilocos region flock into the settlements. It is considered the oldest town in Tarlac. Capas became a pueblo (town) in 1710 beginning as a sleepy settlement at a place between Cutcut River in Sitio Pagbatuan and Gudya (present site) founded by Kapitan Mariano Capiendo. Capas' patron saint is San Nicolas de Tolentino. September 9–10 is the Capas Town Fiesta. Tarlac province was founded on May 28, 1874.

In the course of time, the townspeople of Capas were ordered by the Spanish authorities to change their family name of their own choosing on condition such family names begin with letter “C”, the first letter of Capas. Descendants of the early inhabitants still hold to this day such family names as Capiendo, Capuno, Capitulo, Capule, Capunpun, Cayabyab, Castañeda and Catacutan.

In the 1850s, Capas was a part of the western Pampanga Commandancia Militar de Tarlac which includes the town of Bamban, Concepcion, Victoria, O’Donnell, Murcia, Moriones, Florida Blanca, Porac, Mabalacat, and Magalang.

O’Donnell (Patling) was then a bustling pueblo established by the Augustinians Recolletos Mission in the 1800s named in honor of Carlos O’Donnell y Abreu, the Spanish Minister of State who visited the Patling pueblo. O’Donnell was reverted as a barrio of Capas by the Philippine Commission of 1902 including Moriones reverted to Tarlac town and Murcia back to Concepcion. Capas is known in history as the site of the infamous death march concentration camp during World War II.

Of the etymology of Capas, old folks believed it derived its name from a wild vine "Capas-capas" or it originated from a tree called Capas in the Aetas dialect, Bulak in Pampango or Capaz in Ilocano.

The town has built the Capas National Shrine. It was built and is maintained by the Philippine government as a memorial to the Filipino and American soldiers who died in Camp O'Donnell at the end of the Bataan Death March, which totals to almost 70,000 soldiers and back-up civilians.

This is a memorable site, for all Filipino and American veterans, that relates to Veterans Day in the Philippines. It was once a concentration camp subsequently serving as the burial grounds for thousands of Filipino and American soldiers who perished during World War II. The site was the ultimate destination point of the Bataan Death March involving Filipino and American soldiers who surrendered in Bataan on April 9, 1942.

Camp O'Donnell was a facility of the United States Air Force in Capas, Tarlac, Philippines. Before the facility was transferred to the Philippine Air Force, it was first a Philippine Constabulary post then a United States Army facility.

Another site, Santo Domingo Death March Marker, which is located in Capas were about 60,000 Filipino soldiers who were camped and eventually unloaded to start the second phase of the Death March.

Cityhood

With more than 100,000 populace, an area that is good enough for a city and an income close to ₱250,000,000 becoming a city is not impossible according to Rodriguez. Enshrouding more than 53 percent of this town's land area, the Bases Conversion and Development Authority (BCDA) has included the municipality of Capas in the design of their Master Plan that is now in process, according to re-elected Mayor Antonio “TJ” Rodriguez.

Rodriguez bared this during his inaugural speech at the oath-taking ceremony of newly elected and re-elected municipal officials held at the Multi-Purpose Hall here Monday morning.

TJ said BCDA claims control of the more than 19,900 hectares as a military reservation, where three of their barangays—Santa Juliana, Maruglu and Bueno—were included, while barangays Sta Lucia, Aranguren, Lawy, and O’Donnell were partly taken.

Being included in BCDA's master plan to make Capas a ‘Green City’ soon, TJ said that this town will become the most beautiful and progressive city in the country with the assurance of preserving the environment.

However, with the forthcoming development, the controversy about the land where some Capasenos built their houses a long time ago is still a big issue. Rodriguez, however, vowed that he is with his constituents’ side in fighting for their rights over the land where their dwellings are constructed.

He revealed that as early as June 2011, he already wrote a letter to President Benigno Aquino III, requesting the delineation and redistribution of 5,000 hectares of the BCDA area where his constituents resided.

He said he would continue to consult with the stakeholders who will be affected by the BCDA's master plan.

TJ assured Capasenos that with the new set of Sangguniang Bayan members headed by his party mate, Vice Mayor Roseller “Boots” Rodriguez, their vision towards the New Capas or Bayung Capas would be swiftly attained through their full cooperation and coordination with each other.

During the occasion, the mayor enumerated his accomplishments during his first term, announcing the ₱65 million increase of budget from ₱180 million in 2010 to ₱215 million in 2012.

He said his administration is intending to generate more revenues to finance more projects and programs in health, agriculture, housing, infrastructure, disaster preparedness, and other services.

In 2020, house bills 7861 and 8219 were filed for the conversion of the municipality of Capas into a component city in the province of Tarlac. Both bills are currently pending with the committee on the local government.

Development of New Clark City

New Clark City ground broke in 2016 and is envisioned as a Business Contingency Hub of the National Government where it serves as a backup office should Metro Manila experience emergencies such as earthquakes, floods, and other calamities. It is located in the BCDA reservation in Capas that used to be a test site of military aircraft when Clark Air Base was under control of the United States. NCC will also serve as the primary venue of the 2019 Southeast Asian Games.

Geography
Capas has relatively high ground, hilly places near the mountain range are at an approximate 46 meters. It is bordered by San Jose on the north, Tarlac City on the north-east, Concepcion on the east, Botolan, Zambales, on the west and south-west and Bamban on the rest of the southern parts. The west side of the town is mountainous while the east side is a plain. The town is also known as "The Gateway to Pinatubo Volcano." The town also consists of Hot springs and several freshwater lakes like the Tambo Lake.

Many of the streams in the province contain small bits of petrified wood, fish, freshwater crabs, and other animals. Namria and Dingding creek merge as the two major tributaries to Lucong river in Concepcion. Most of Tarlac's waterways that originate from Mount Pinatubo pass through Capas, including the Bulsa Moriones River and Santa Lucia River that form Tarlac River.

Barangays
Capas is politically subdivided into 20 barangays.

Aranguren — named after Archbishop Jose Aranguren (OAS), the Roman Catholic Administrator of this area during the Spanish mission and colonization time
Bueno
Cristo Rey (formerly known as Navy)
Cubcub (Poblacion)
Cutcut 1st (Poblacion)
Cutcut 2nd (Poblacion)
Dolores (Poblacion)
Estrada (Calingcuan)
Lawy
Manga
Manlapig
Maruglu
O'Donnell
Santa Juliana
Santa Lucia
Santa Rita
Santo Domingo 1st (Poblacion)
Santo Domingo 2nd (Poblacion)
Santo Rosario (Poblacion)
Talaga

The original Capas was Pagbatuan where the Aetas resides before the new settlers came to the now proper town of Capas.
Barangay Cutcut, meaning "hole", "gorge" or "dug up hole", is known for its landfill where garbage from other municipalities is disposed. Malutung gabun or Red sand has a replica of Capas National Shrine which is sometimes featured on Philippine maps. Barangay Santo Rosario (Holy Rosary) has Villa De Santo Rosario, Rosary-ville, Small Tokyo which was formerly a Japanese Garrison hence its name, Pascuala which has the most poultries and piggeries in Capas it also has one of the most polluted tributaries to Lucong river because surrounding piggeries have made it wastewaters for pig excrement, despite protests, the government has taken little to no action regarding the pollution caused by piggeries. Pinagpala which has a sugar-cane farm, mango plantations, etc. Santo Rosario is also the location of Capas Public Cemetery or Cabu Santu, the original Capas cemetery was once located where the entrance way to Small Tokyo near the Barangay Hall. , as well as the San Nicolas De Tolentino Parish which is the town church that stands next to the Dominican College of Tarlac. Other schools in Capas include Capas East Central School, Capas High School (Formerly: Dolores High School), Gabaldon Elementary School, Montessori School of St. Nicholas among others. Wellspring High School and Capas Christian School are the new private schools.

Cubcub, Cut-Cut II, Santo Domingo I, Santo Domingo II, and Santo Rosario are the town's poblacion and location of the public market. Santa Rita is among the smallest barrios (barangays) of the municipality but has a church and school. Barangay Talaga is known for its production of Tinapa or smoked fish, Barangay Dolores has its garden plants and Santo Domingo has the Capas Junction which also has fast-food chains like the town proper. Barangay Aranguren (aling goring) is home to Poet Laureate Renato Alzadon, who is also known as the current "Ari ning Parnasong Capampangan" or "King of Capampangan Literature", it is also the location of Capas National Shrine, Sitio Kasulukan, Calumpit, Dalang Baka, Aquino Page Village (Kamatis) and Bullhorn. Barangay Manlapig has rice fields and is among the liveliest barangays during the evening. Barangay Lawy is known for being a place for many of the first Ilocano settlers in the municipality. Barangay Mangga (Mango) used to be filled with the fruit-bearing tree or presumably. Barangay Estrada is the last stop before reaching Tarlac City through McArthur highway. Patling, Santa Lucia, Bueno, Maruglu and Santa Juliana are mountainous and hilly while filled with vast lands and forest, presumably the place where the earliest settlers of the town stayed.

Subdivisions and villages
As one of the richest towns in the province, it consists of numerous subdivisions and exclusive villages.

Dominican Hill Subdivision (Cut-Cut 1st)
Hilltop Subdivision (Cut-Cut 1st)
Regina Northview Subdivision (Cut-Cut 1st)
Villa San Jose (Cut-Cut 1st)
Doña Lutgarda Subdivision (Cut-Cut I)
Amaia Scapes (Estrada)
Villa Generosa (Estrada)
Villa De Concepcion (Talaga)
BellaVista (Santo Domingo II)
Vargas Subdivision (Santo Domingo II)
Villa Necita (Santo Domingo II)
Villa De Santo Rosario (Santo Rosario)
RosaryVille (Santo Rosario)
Saint Paul Homes (Santo Domingo I)
Robinson Homes Grand Tierra (Santo Domingo I)
Cenizal Subdivision (Santo Domingo II)
Kathrine Ville (Cut-Cut 1st)

Climate

Demographics

The people of Capas are predominantly Kapampangan because of their close ties from Pampanga. Ilocano is also used. The town is also predominantly Roman Catholic but there are also Christian congregations of some sects, like Iglesia ni Cristo, The Church of Jesus Christ of Latter-day Saints, Jehovah's Witnesses, Baptist and Jesus Miracle Crusade.

Economy

Tourism
Capas is the location of Mount Telakawa or Straw hat Mountain on the boundaries of Santa Juliana and Maruglu. It also provides access to Mount Pinatubo via the preferred route through Barangay Santa Juliana. Mount Bueno is the site of Bueno hot springs in Barangay Bueno. Malatarlak and Salay or Lemon grass grow abundantly on Mor-Asia or Talahib mountain at Sitio Kalangitan. Mount Canouman is the largest in terms of surface area, known as the mountain of Spirits, it is a dangerous 10-hour walk from Sitio Salangui. The majority of mountains in Capas are relatively easy climbs. Mount Dalin, the smaller straw hat mountain is near a 300-meter peak called Prayer Mountain or Peniel where a few rooms are available for rent.

Mount Pinatubo
Mount Telakawa
Mount Canouman
Bueno Hot Springs
Tambo Lake
Peniel
Pinatubo Trail
Capas National Shrine
Hanging Bridge
War Museum at the old Capas PNR Station
Asia Golf and Spa

The feast day of San Nicolas De Tolentino is held every 10 September; the origin of the name Capas is disputed but has two prominent sources, it is said that town was either named after the edible plant called Capas-Capas or was taken from the first three letters of the surnames Capitulo, Capunfuerza, Capunpue, Capili, Capongga, Capunpun, Capati, Capil and Capuno, etc. then adding the letters "a" and "s" hence forming "Capas".

Capas National Shrine
The municipality is home to the Capas National Shrine, an obelisk with a central bell, which was built and is maintained by the Philippine government as a memorial to the Filipino and American soldiers who died in Camp O'Donnell at Barangay Aranguren. during the end of the Bataan Death March. This is an important site related to Veterans Day in the Philippines, every April 9, the anniversary of the surrender of the defending US and Philippine Commonwealth forces to the Japanese in 1942. When the raid at Capas on 1945, combined US and Philippine Commonwealth ground troops supporting local recognized guerrillas freed by few thousands of Filipino and American POW's on Bataan Death March and attacking Japanese forces. This is a memorable site, for all Filipino and Americans veterans. that relates to Veterans Day in the Philippines. It was once a concentration camp subsequently serving as the burial grounds for thousands of Filipino and American soldiers who perished during World War II. The site was the ultimate destination point of the infamous Death March involving Filipino and American soldiers who surrendered in Bataan on April 9, 1942.

Camp O'Donnell was a facility of the United States Air Force in Capas, Tarlac, Philippines. Before the facility was transferred to the Air Force, it was first a Philippine Constabulary post then a United States Army facility.

Another site, Santo Domingo Death March Marker, which is located in Capas were about 60,000 Filipino soldiers who were camped and eventually unloaded to start the second phase of the Death March.

Government
The following officials assumed their offices on the noon of the 30th day of June, 2022. Except the Ex-officios of the Sangguniang Bayan

Mayor 
Atty. Roseller B. Rodriguez (PDPLaban)

Vice-Mayor 
Alexander Espinosa (PDPLaban)

Sangguniang Bayan 

 Jeff Ticsay (NPC)
 Felipe Ong (NPC)
 Telang Manlupig (NPC)
 Jake Lopez (NPC)
 Drigs Dueñas (PDPLaban)
 Ariel Batican (PDPLaban)
 Edith Yumul (PDPLaban)
 Nestor Sicat (PDPLaban)

Ex-Officio's

 Arnold Arcilla - ABC President
 Victor Valentin - Indigenous' People Representative
 Reymart Catacutan - Federation of the Sangguniang Kabataan President

Gallery

References

External links

Capas Profile at PhilAtlas.com
[ Philippine Standard Geographic Code]
Philippine Census Information
Local Governance Performance Management System

Municipalities of Tarlac